Boisar railway station is a railway station on the Western line of the Mumbai Suburban Railway network. It is also a terminus for the Boisar - Vasai Road line.

The Station is the main mode of transportation for population here. In the last decade five new local train trains were introduced for route Dahanu Road to Virar/Churchgate and two for route Bhiwandi to Boisar. Many express trains stops at the station. The Mumbai to Ahmadabad bullet train will pass through the station.

It is very busy station between dahanu-virar .

Mumbai Suburban Railway stations
Railway stations in Palghar district
Mumbai WR railway division